The Life of Pi'erre 4 is the debut studio album by American record producer and rapper Pi'erre Bourne. It was released on June 21, 2019, by SossHouse Records and Interscope Records. The album debuted at number 107 on the Billboard 200 albums chart in the United States.

Almost exactly a year after the album's release, a deluxe edition was released on June 19, 2020.

Track listing
All tracks written and produced by Pi'erre Bourne, except where noted.

Sample credits
 "Ballad" contains an uncredited sample of "Jumblegloss", written by Stephen Malkmus and performed by Stephen Malkmus and the Jicks.
 "Lovers" contains a sample of "It's Forever", written by Leon Huff and performed by The Ebonys.

Personnel
James Kang – mixing and recording
Tatsuya Sato – mastering

Charts

References

2019 debut albums
Interscope Records albums
Albums produced by Pi'erre Bourne
Pi'erre Bourne albums